Wild Goose Pagoda may refer to two different Buddhist pagodas in Xi'an, Shaanxi, China:

Giant Wild Goose Pagoda, in Yanta District, Xi'an
Small Wild Goose Pagoda, in Beilin District, Xi'an

See also
Yanta District, Xi'an, literally "Wild Goose Pagoda District", named after the pagoda
Wild Goose (disambiguation)